Folgueras is one of seven parishes (administrative divisions) in the Coaña municipality, within the province and autonomous community of Asturias, in northern Spain. 

The population is 803 (INE 2007).

Villages
 Abranedo (Eonavian: Abredo)
 Ansilán (Anxilán)
 Barqueros (Barqueiros)
 El Espín (L'Espín)
 Folgueras (Folgueiras)
 Jarrio (Xarrio)
 La Esfreita (A Esfreita)
 Meiro
 Torce

References

Parishes in Coaña